In mathematics, the Dawson–Gärtner theorem is a result in large deviations theory.  Heuristically speaking, the Dawson–Gärtner theorem allows one to transport a large deviation principle on a “smaller” topological space to a “larger” one.

Statement of the theorem
Let (Yj)j∈J be a projective system of Hausdorff topological spaces with maps pij : Yj → Yi.  Let X be the projective limit (also known as the inverse limit) of the system (Yj, pij)i,j∈J, i.e.

Let (με)ε>0 be a family of probability measures on X.  Assume that, for each j ∈ J, the push-forward measures (pj∗με)ε>0 on Yj satisfy the large deviation principle with good rate function Ij : Yj → R ∪ {+∞}.  Then the family (με)ε>0 satisfies the large deviation principle on X with good rate function I : X → R ∪ {+∞} given by

References

  (See theorem 4.6.1)

Asymptotic analysis
Large deviations theory
Probability theorems